Nathaniel Edmund Moreland (April 22, 1914 – November 27, 1973) was an American baseball pitcher in the Negro leagues, Mexican League and Minor League Baseball. He played professionally from 1940 to 1956 with  several clubs.

References

External links
 and Seamheads

Baltimore Elite Giants players
Alijadores de Tampico players
Industriales de Monterrey players
Los Angeles White Sox players
El Centro Imperials players
1914 births
1973 deaths
American expatriate baseball players in Mexico
20th-century African-American sportspeople
Baseball pitchers